Isopogon tridens, commonly known as the three-toothed coneflower, is a species of flowering plant in the family Proteaceae and is endemic to the southwest of Western Australia. It is a shrub with wedge-shaped leaves with two or three sharply-pointed teeth, and flattened-spherical heads of glabrous creamy white, sometimes purple flowers.

Description
The flowers are arranged on the ends of branchlets in sessile, flattened-spherical heads  in diameter with hairy, broadly egg-shaped involucral bracts at the base.

Taxonomy
Three-toothed coneflower was first formally described in 1855 by Carl Meissner who gave it the name Isopogon trilobus var. tridens in Hooker's Journal of Botany and Kew Garden Miscellany from specimens collected by James Drummond. In 1868, Ferdinand von Mueller changed the name to Isopogon tridens in 'Fragmenta phytographiae Australiae.

Distribution and habitatIsopogon tridens'' usually grows shrubland or heath and in a small area from near the Arrowsmith River to Eneabba in the Geraldton Sandplains biogeographic region in the south-west of Western Australia.

Conservation status
This isopogon is classified as "not threatened" by the Government of Western Australia Department of Parks and Wildlife.

References

tridens
Eudicots of Western Australia
Plants described in 1855
Taxa named by Carl Meissner